Teniente Manuel Clavero District  (Spanish teniente lieutenant)  is one of four districts of the Putumayo Province in Peru. It is also the northernmost district in Peru.

Authorities 
The current mayor of the district is Luis Enrique Calderón Aspajo (Fuerza Loretana).

See also 
 Administrative divisions of Peru

References

External links
 Municipalidad Distrital de Teniente Manuel Clavero  - City council official website (in Spanish)
 INEI Peru (in Spanish)

Districts of the Loreto Region
Districts of the Putumayo Province